The Rostelecom Cup, formerly the Cup of Russia, is an international, senior-level figure skating competition held as part of the ISU Grand Prix of Figure Skating series since 1996. Organized by the Figure Skating Federation of Russia, it has most frequently been held in Moscow, with several editions held in Saint Petersburg and once in Sochi. Medals are awarded in the disciplines of men's singles, ladies' singles, pair skating, and ice dancing.

The event adopted the name Rostelecom Cup in 2009 after its title sponsor. It was dropped in 2010, but returned in 2011. The Rostelecom Cup is a successor to the Prize of Moscow News, an annual elite international event held in the Soviet Union from 1966 to 1990 (excluding 1989).

In April 2022, the ISU canceled the 2022 Rostelecom Cup, which was to have been held in Russia in November. This decision was made in response to the International Olympic Committee’s recommendation to bar Russia and Belarus from holding international athletic competitions until further notice, after Russia’s invasion of Ukraine in February 2022.

Medalists

Men

Ladies

Pairs

Ice dancing

References

External links

 Grand Prix of Figure Skating at the International Skating Union

 
ISU Grand Prix of Figure Skating
International figure skating competitions hosted by Russia
Recurring sporting events established in 1996
1996 establishments in Russia